Frank Levick (1882 – 1 February 1908) was an English footballer who played for Sheffield United, mostly at inside left, during the 1907–08 season. He had previously played for Rotherham Town and Tinsley.

Born in Eckington, Levick made his debut for Sheffield United on 21 September 1907 against Manchester United at Bank Street. He broke his collar bone while playing against Newcastle United on New Year's Day 1908. While recovering from the injury, he contracted a cold which developed into pneumonia. He died of heart failure as a result of pneumonia, on 1 February 1908 in Sheffield.

References

1882 births
Date of birth missing
1908 deaths
English footballers
People from Eckington, Derbyshire
Footballers from Derbyshire
Association football inside forwards
Tinsley Amateurs F.C. players
Rotherham Town F.C. (1899) players
Sheffield United F.C. players
English Football League players
Association football players who died while playing
Deaths from pneumonia in England
Sport deaths in England